Ivan II may refer to:

Ivan II of Bulgaria (c. 1290 – c. 1329)
Ivan II of Moscow  (1326–1359; patronymic Ivanovich, styled "the Fair")
Ivan II Draskovic, Croatian viceroy (1550–1613)